Guntur revenue division is an administrative division in the Guntur district of the Indian state of Andhra Pradesh. It comprises 10 mandals and is one of the two revenue divisions in the district, along with Tenali. Guntur serves as the headquarters of the division.

Administration 

The mandals in the revenue division are:

See also 
List of revenue divisions in Andhra Pradesh

References 

Revenue divisions in Guntur district